The following list is a complete collection of results for the Samoa national rugby league team. It includes all Test matches, including World Cup and Pacific Cup matches and International Friendlies.

All-time records

Test matches

1980s

1990s

2000s

2010s

2020s

See also

Rugby league in Samoa
Samoa national rugby league team
Samoa women's national rugby league team

References

External links

Samoa national rugby league team
Rugby league-related lists